Pál Király (7 November 1896 – 4 January 1969) was a Hungarian long-distance runner. He competed in the 10,000 metres and the marathon at the 1924 Summer Olympics.

References

External links
 

1896 births
1969 deaths
Athletes (track and field) at the 1924 Summer Olympics
Hungarian male long-distance runners
Hungarian male marathon runners
Olympic athletes of Hungary
People from Pest, Hungary
Athletes from Budapest
20th-century Hungarian people